Łyszkowice may refer to:
Łyszkowice, Lesser Poland Voivodeship (south Poland)
Łyszkowice, Łowicz County in Łódź Voivodeship (central Poland)
Łyszkowice, Poddębice County in Łódź Voivodeship (central Poland)
Gmina Łyszkowice, Łowicz County, Łódź Voivodeship, central Poland